The Russo-Turkish War of 1686–1700 was part of the joint European effort to confront the Ottoman Empire. The larger European conflict was known as the Great Turkish War.

The Russo-Turkish War began after the Tsardom of Russia joined the European anti-Turkish coalition (Habsburg monarchy, Poland–Lithuania, Venice) in 1686, after Poland-Lithuania agreed to recognize Russian incorporation of Kiev and the left bank of Ukraine.

War

During the war, the Russian army organized the Crimean campaigns of 1687 and 1689 both which ended in Russian defeats. Despite these setbacks, Russia launched the Azov campaigns in 1695 and 1696, and after raising the siege in 1695 successfully occupied Azov in 1696.

Peace treaty
In light of preparations for the war against the Swedish Empire, Russian Tsar Peter the Great signed the Treaty of Karlowitz with the Ottoman Empire in 1699. The subsequent Treaty of Constantinople in 1700, ceded Azov, the Taganrog fortress, Pavlovsk and Mius to Russia and established a Russian ambassador in Constantinople, and secured the return of all prisoners of war. The Tsar also affirmed that his subordinates, the Cossacks, would not attack the Ottomans, while the Sultan affirmed his subordinates, the Crimean Tatars, would not attack the Russians.

References

Sources

17th-century conflicts
Russo-Turkish wars
Military operations involving the Crimean Khanate
17th-century military history of Russia
17th century in Ukraine
Military history of Ukraine
Great Turkish War